This article lists compositions written for piano duo. The list includes works for piano four-hands and works for two pianos. Catalogue number and date of composition are also included. Ordering is by composer surname.

A list of notable performers who played and recorded these works is at List of classical piano duos (performers).

Piano four hands 
 Anton Arensky (1861–1906)
 Twelve Pieces, Op. 66 (1903)
 Johann Christian Bach (1735–1782)
 Sonata for keyboard 4-hands, Op. 15 No. 6 (1778)
 Sonata for keyboard 4-hands, Op. 18 No. 5 (1781)
 Sonata for keyboard 4-hands, Op. 18 No. 6 (1781)
 Samuel Barber (1910–1981)
 Souvenirs, Op. 28 (1951)
 Ludwig van Beethoven (1770–1827)
 Sonata for Piano 4 hands in D major, Op. 6 (1797)
 3 Marches, Op. 45 (1803)
 Fugue for Piano, four hands, Op. 134 (1826, arrangement of Große Fuge, Op. 133)
 Luciano Berio (1925–2003)
 Touch (1991)
 Canzonetta (1991)
 Georges Bizet (1838–1875)
 Jeux d'enfants, Op. 22 (1871)
 Johannes Brahms (1833–1897)
 Variations on a theme by Robert Schumann, Op. 23 (1861)
 Sixteen Waltzes, Op. 39 (1865)
 Ungarische Tänze, WoO 1 (1869–80)
 Ferruccio Busoni (1866–1924)
 Fuge über das Volkslied "O, du mein lieber Augustin", BV 226 (1888)
 Finnländische Volksweisen, BV 227 (1888)
 Emmanuel Chabrier (1841–1894)
 Pas redoublé (Cortège burlesque) (1881)
 Prélude et marche française (1885)
 Souvenirs de Munich, Quadrille sur les thèmes favoris de Tristan et Isolde de Richard Wagner (1887)
 Muzio Clementi (1752–1832)
 3 Duets, Op. 3, No. 1-3 (1779)
 Duet, Op. 6, No. 1 (1780)
 3 Duets, Op. 14 (1785)
 Claude Debussy (1862–1918)
 Symphony in B minor, L. 10 (1880–81)
 Divertissement, L. 36 (1884)
 Petite Suite, L. 65a (1888–89)
 Marche ecossaise sur un theme populaire, L. 77 (1891)
 Six épigraphes antiques, L. 131 (1914, used music from Musique de scene pour Les Chansons de Bilitis)
 David Del Tredici (born 1937)
 Carioca Boy – Tango (2009)
 Antonín Dvořák (1841–1904) 
 Legends, Op. 59 (1881) 
 Slavonic Dances, Opp. 46 and 72 (1878, 1886)
 Ze Šumavy, Op. 68 (1883)
 Gabriel Fauré (1845–1924) 
 Dolly Suite, Op. 56 (1894–97)
 Allegro symphonique, Op. 68 (1895)
 Morton Feldman (1926–1987)
 Piano Three Hands for piano three-hands (1957)
 Piano Four Hands (1958)
 Jean Françaix (1912–1997)
 Ronde Louis XV  and Le Hameau from Si Versailles m'était conté (1953)
 Napoléon (1954)
 15 Portraits of Children from Auguste Renoir (1971)
 Antón García Abril (1933–2021)
 Zapateado (1995)
 Homenaje a Copérnico (2009)
 Leopold Godowsky (1870–1938)
 46 Miniatures (1918)
 Edvard Grieg (1843–1907)
 In Autumn, Op. 11 (1866)
 2 Symphonic Pieces, Op. 14 (1863–64, arranged from Symphony No. 1)
 Norwegian Dances, Op. 35 (1881)
 Waltz-Caprices, Op. 37 (1883)
 Carlos Guastavino (1912–2000)
 Romance del Plata - Sonatina (1987)
 Josef Matthias Hauer (1883–1959)
 Zwölftonspiel (21 March 1952)
 Zwölftonspiel (April–May 1952)
 Zwölftonspiel (24 June 1952)
 Zwölftonspiel with poem of E. Lasker-Schüler (28 June 1952)
 Zwölftonspiel (10 July 1952)
 Zwölftonspiel (April 1955)
 Zwölftonspiel (May 1955)
 Zwölftonspiel (13 January 1956)
 Zwölftonspiel (April 1956)
 Zwölftonspiel (July 1956)
 Zwölftonspiel (October 1956)
 Zwölftonspiel (July 1957)
Swan Hennessy (1866–1929)
 Petite suite irlandaise, d'après des airs anciens de la collection Petrie, Op. 29 (1909)
 Paul Hindemith (1895–1963)
 Eight Waltzes, Drei wunderschöne Mädchen im Schwarzwald, Op. 6 (1916)
 Sonata for piano four-hands (1938)
 Alan Hovhaness (1911–2000)
 Child in the Garden, Op. 168 (1958)
 Marie Jaëll (1846-1925)
 Valses pour piano á quatre mains, Op. 8 - piano four-hands
 Voix du Printemps - piano four-hands
 György Kurtág (born 1926)
 Suite (1950–51)
 Játékok, volumes IV and VIII (1979, 2010)
 Constant Lambert (1905-1951)
 Trois Pièces Nègres pour les Touches Blanches (1949)
 György Ligeti (1923–2006)
 Induló (March) (1942)
 Polifón etüd (Polyphonic Étude) (1943)
 Allegro (1943)
 Három lakodalmi tánc (Three Wedding Dances) (1950)
 Sonatina (1950)
 Franz Liszt (1811–1886)
 Festpolonaise, S. 255(619a)
 Variation über das Thema von Borodin, S. 256(207a)
 Bohuslav Martinů (1890–1959)
 Avec un doigt for piano 3-hands, H 185 (1930)
 Felix Mendelssohn (1809–1847)
 Allegro brillant, Op. 92 (1841)
 Darius Milhaud (1892–1974)
 Enfantines, Suite after 3 poèmes de Jean Cocteau, Op. 59a (1920)
 Wolfgang Amadeus Mozart (1756–1791)
 Sonata in C major, K. 19d (1765)
 Sonata in B flat major, K. 358/186c (1773–74)
 Sonata in D major, K. 381/123a (1773–74)
 Fugue in G minor, K. 401/375e (1773)
 Sonata in F major, K. 497 (1786)
 Andante and Variations in G major, K. 501 (1786)
 Sonata in C major, K. 521 (1787)
 Lior Navok (1971)
 At the Edge of a Spiral (2004)
 Francis Poulenc (1899–1963)
 Sonata for piano four hands, FP 8 (1918, 1939)
 Sergei Rachmaninoff (1873–1943)
 Six Morceaux, Op. 11 (1894)
 Polka Italienne (1906)
 Maurice Ravel (1875–1937)
 Shéhérazade (1898)
 Ma mère l'oye (1910)
 Max Reger (1873–1916)
 Twelve Caprice Waltzes, Op. 9 (1892)
 Twenty German Dances, Op. 10 (1892)
 Six Waltzes, Op. 22 (1898)
 Cinq pièces pittoresques, Op. 34 (1899)
 Sechs Burlesken, Op. 58 (1901)
 Six Pieces, Op. 94 (1906)
 Introduction and Passacaglia for Organ in D Minor (1914)
 Variations and Fugue on a Theme by Mozart, Op. 132 (1914; arrangement by the composer)
 Camille Saint-Saëns (1835–1921)
 Duettino, Op. 11 (1855)
 König Harald Harfagar, Op. 59 (1880)
 Feuillet d'album, Op. 81 (1887)
 Pas redoublé, Op. 86 (1887)
 Berceuse, Op. 105 (1896)
 Marche dédiée aux étudiants d'Alger, with chorus ad lib, Op. 163 (1921)
 Erik Satie (1866–1925)
 Trois morceaux en forme de poire (1903)
 Aperçus désagréables (1908, 1912)
 En habit de cheval (1911)
 Alfred Schnittke (1934-1998)
 Sonatina for piano four hands (1995)
 Franz Schubert (1797–1828)
 Four Polonaises, Op. 75, D 599 (1818)
 Trois Marches héroiques, Op. 27, D 602 (1818 or 1824)
 Notre amitié est invariable, Op. posth. 138, D 608 (1818)
 Sonata in B-flat major, Op.30, D 617 (1818)
 Eight Variations on a French Song, Op. 10, D 624 (1818)
 Overture in F major, Op. 34, D 675 (1819)
 Trois Marches militaires, Op. 51, D. 733 (1818)
 Overture to the Opera Alfonso und Estrella, Op. 69, D 773 (1823)
 Grand Duo, Op. posth. 140, D. 812 (1824)
 Eight Variations on an Original Theme, Op. 35, D 813 (1824)
 Divertissement à la hongroise, Op. 54, D 818 (1824)
 Six Grandes Marches, Op. 40, D 819 (1818 or 1824)
 Divertissement sur des motifs originaux français, Op. 63 and Op. 84 No. 1-2, D 823 (1826–27)
 Six Polonaises, Op. 61, D 824 (1826)
 Grande Marche funèbre, Op. 55, D 859 (1825)
 Grande Marche héroique, Op. 66, D 885 (1826)
 Eight Variations on a Theme from Hérold's Opera Marie, Op. 82 No. 1, D 908 (1827)
 Fantasy in F minor, Op. 103, D. 940 (1828)
 Lebensstürme, Op. posth. 144, D. 947 (1828)
 Grand Rondeau, Op. 107, D. 951 (1828)
 Fugue in E minor, Op. posth. 152, D 952 (1828)
 Introduction, Four Variations on an Original Theme and Finale, Op. posth. 82 No. 2, D 968A
 Deux Marches caractéristiques, Op. posth. 121, D 968B
 Robert Schumann (1810–1856)
 Bilder aus Osten, Op. 66 (1848)
 12 Piano Pieces for Young and Older Children, Op. 85 (1849)
 Ball-Scenen, Op. 109 (1851)
 Kinderball, Op. 130 (1853)
 Juan María Solare (born 1966)
 FAQ (Frequently Asked Questions) (2002)
 Milonga Nunca Más (1994+2007)
 Orangutango (2008)
 Reencuentro (2008)
 Quince bajo cero (tango para Juliana) (2010)
 Conjeturas sistemáticas (2013)
 Persecuta (2013)
 They go (2014)
 Karlheinz Stockhausen (1928–2007)
 Intervall, from Für kommende Zeiten, Nr. 33 (1968–70)
 Igor Stravinsky (1882–1971)
 Trois pièces faciles (1915)
 Rite of Spring (1913). Arr. by Igor Stravinsky
 Cinq pièces faciles (1917)
 Josef Tal (1910–2008)
 Pieces for piano four hands (1931)
 A Little Walk for piano four hands (1951)
 A Tale in Four Parts for piano 4-hands (1988)
 Carl Vine (1954) 
 Sonata for piano four hands (2009)
 Bruno Vlahek (1986)
 Sonata, Op. 21 (2008)
 Variations on a Croatian folk theme, Op. 38 (2013)
 Peter Warlock
 Capriol Suite (1926)
 Charles Wuorinen (1938–2020)
 Making Ends Meet (1966)
 Juan Carlos Zorzi (1935–1999)
 Música para calesita (ca. 1980)

Two pianos 
 John Adams (born 1947)
 Hallelujah Junction (1996)
 Anton Arensky (1861–1906)
 Suite No. 1, Op. 15 (1888)
 Suite No. 2, Silhouettes, Op. 23 (1892)
 Suite No. 3, Variations, Op. 33 (1894)
 Suite No. 4, Op. 62 (1903)
 Suite No. 5, Children's Suite, op. 65
 Johann Christian Bach (1735–1782)
 Sonata in G Major for two harpsichords or two pianos, Op. 15, No. 5 (1778)
 Béla Bartók (1881–1945)
 Seven pieces from Mikrokosmos, Sz. 108 (1926–39)
 Arnold Bax (1883–1953)
 Fantasia (1900)
 Moy Mell (1916)
 Hardanger (1927)
 The Poisoned Fountain (1928)
 The Devil that tempted St Anthony (1928)
 Sonata for two pianos (1929)
 Red Autumn (1931)
 Luciano Berio (1925–2003)
 Wasserklavier (1965)
 Claude Bolling (1930–2020)
 Sonata for Two Pianists 1 and 2 (1989)
 Pierre Boulez (1925–2016)
 Structures I and II (1952, 1961)
 Johannes Brahms (1833–1897)
 Sonata in F minor, Op. 34b (1863)
 Waltzes, Op. 39 (1865)
 Variations on a Theme by Haydn, Op. 56b (1873)
 Mia Brentano
 Mia Brentano's Hidden Sea: 20 Songs for 2 Pianos (2018)
 Benjamin Britten (1913–1976)
Introduction and Rondo alla burlesca, Op. 23 No. 1 (1940)
Mazurka Elegiaca, Op. 23 No. 2 (1941)
 David Brubeck (1920–2012)
 Points on Jazz (1961)
 Ferruccio Busoni (1866–1924)
 Prelude and Fugue in C Minor, BV 99 (1878)
 Improvisation on the Bach Chorale "Wie wohl ist mir, o Freund der Seele", BV 271b (1916)
 Duettino concertante after Mozart, BV B 88 (1919)
 Fantasia contrappuntistica, BV 256b (1922)
 John Cage (1912–1992)
 A Book of Music for two prepared pianos (1944)
 Experiences No. 1 (1945)
 Three Dances for two prepared pianos (1945)
 Furniture Music Etcetera (1980)
 Two2 (1989)
 Jacques Castérède (born 1926)
 Crosses on Fire for 2 pianos (Feux croisés pour deux pianos) (1963)
 Emmanuel Chabrier (1841–1894)
 Trois valses romantiques (1883)
 Frédéric Chopin (1810–1849)
 Rondo in C major, Op. posth. 73 (1828)
 Aaron Copland (1900-1990)
 Danzón Cubano (1942)
 Muzio Clementi (1752–1832)
 Duet (Sonata) in B flat major, Op. 1a No. 6 (1781)
 Duet (Sonata) in B flat major, Op. 12 No. 5 (1784?)
 Claude Debussy (1862–1918)
 Trois Nocturnes, (1892–1899). Arr. by Maurice Ravel (1910)
 Lindaraja, L. 97 (1901)
 En blanc et noir, L. 134 (1915)
 Henri Dutilleux (1916–2013)
 Figures de résonances (1970–76)
 George Enescu (1881–1955)
 Variations on an Original Theme in A major, Op. 5 (1898)
 Morton Feldman (1926–1987)
 Projection 3 (1951)
 Intermission 6 for one or two pianos (1953)
 Two Pieces for Two Pianos (1954)
 Two Pianos (1957)
 Work for Two Pianists (1958)
 Vertical Thoughts I (1963)
 Jean Françaix (1912–1997)
 Huit danses exotiques (1957)
 Antón García Abril (1933–2021)
 Madrid (1998)
 Philip Glass (born 1937)
 In Again Out Again (1967)
 Four Movements for Two Pianos (2008)
 Karel Goeyvaerts (1923–1993)
 Sonata for Two Pianos (1950–51)
 Percy Grainger (1882–1961)
 Hill Song No. 1 and No. 2 (1922)
 Edvard Grieg (1843–1907)
 Old Norwegian Melody with Variations, Op. 51 (1890)
 Jorge Grundman (born 1961)
 (There Are) Not So Many Different Rains, Op. 79 (2021)
 Carlos Guastavino (1912–2000)
 Tres Romances argentinos
 Hans Werner Henze (1926–2012)
 Divertimenti per due pianoforti (1964)
 Paul Hindemith (1895–1963)
 Sonata for two pianos (1942)
 Arthur Honegger (1892–1955)
 Partita, H 139 (1940)
 Alan Hovhaness (1911–2000)
 Vijag, Op. 37 (1946)
 Mihr, Op. 60 (1945)
 Ko-ola-u, Op. 136 (1962)
 O Lord, Bless Thy Mountains for 2 pianos tuned a quarter-tone apart, Op. 276 (1974)
 Dorothy Howell (1898–1982)
 Spindrift (1920)
 Recuerdos Preciosos (1934)
 Mazurka (1937)
 Manuel Infante (1883–1958)
 3 Danzas Andaluzas (1922)
 Charles Ives (1874–1954)
 Burlesque Storm
 Three Quarter-Tone Pieces for 2 pianos tuned a quarter-tone apart
 Nikolai Kapustin (1937–2020)
 Paraphrase On Dizzy Gillespile's Manteca, Op. 129 (2006)
 György Ligeti (1923–2006)
 Three Pieces – Monument – Selbstporträt – Bewegung (1976)
 Franz Liszt (1811–1886)
 Grosses Konzertstück über Themen aus Mendelssohns Lieder ohne Worte, S. 257 (1834)
 Concerto pathétique, S. 258 (1855,66)
 Witold Lutosławski (1913–1994)
 Variations on a Theme by Paganini (1941)
 Peter Machajdik (1961)
 It's Not The Mist (2018)
 Andrew March (1973)
 Nymphéas for Two Pianos (2001)
 Bohuslav Martinů (1890–1959)
 La Fantaisie, H 180 (1929)
 Trois Danses Tchèques pour deux pianos, H 324 (1949)
 Impromptu, H 359 (1956)
 Grace-Evangeline Mason (1994–)
 Pinhole Planetarium, Seeing Stars (2018)
 Felix Mendelssohn (1809–1847)
 Duo concertant, WoO 25 (1833)
 Olivier Messiaen (1908–1992)
 Visions de l'Amen (1943)
 Darius Milhaud (1892–1974)
 Scaramouche, Op. 165b, after the incidental music Le médécin volant (1937)
 Carnaval à la Nouvelle-Orléans, Op. 275 (1947)
 Wolfgang Amadeus Mozart (1756–1791)
 Fugue in C minor, K. 426 (1783)
 Sonata in D major, K. 448/375a (1781)
 Sonata in C major, K. 545 (1788). Arr. by Edvard Grieg
 Lior Navok (1971)
 The Little Mermaid, for two pianos and chamber ensemble / orchestra (2006)
 Astor Piazzolla (1921–1992)
 Suite portena de ballet
 Francis Poulenc (1899–1963)
 Le voyage en Amérique, FP 149 (1951, music for film)
 L'Embarquement pour Cythère, FP 150 (1951, after Le voyage en Amérique)
 Sonata for Two Pianos, FP 156 (1953)
 Capriccio for 2 pianos, FP 155 (1952, after Le bal Masqué)
 Elégie (en accords alternés), FP 175 (1959)
 Sergei Rachmaninoff (1873–1943)
 Russian Rhapsody in E minor (1891)
 Suite No. 1, Op. 5 (1893)
 Suite No. 2, Op. 17 (1901)
 Symphonic Dances, Op. 45 (1940). Arr. by Sergei Rachmaninoff
 Maurice Ravel (1875–1937)
 Sites auriculaires (1895–97)
 Rapsodie espagnole (1907)
 La Valse. Arr. by Maurice Ravel
 Max Reger (1873–1916)
 Variations and Fugue on a Theme by Beethoven, Op. 86 (1904)
 Introduction, Passacaglia and Fugue in B Minor, Op. 96 (1906)
 Variations and Fugue on a Theme by Mozart, Op. 132a (1914; arrangement by the composer)
 Camille Saint-Saëns (1835–1921)
 Variations sur un thème de Beethoven, Op. 35 (1874)
 Caprice arabe, Op. 96 (1884)
 Polonaise, Op. 77 (1885)
 Scherzo, Op. 87 (1889)
 Caprice héroïque, Op. 106 (1898)
 Robert Schumann (1810–1856)
 Andante and variations, Op. 46, (1843)
 Alexander Scriabin (1872–1915)
 Fantasy in A minor, Op. posth. (1890)
 Dmitri Shostakovich (1906–1975)
 Suite for Two Pianos, Op. 6 (1922)
 Concertino, Op. 94 (1953)
 Karlheinz Stockhausen (1928–2007)
Mantra (1970)
 Juan María Solare (born 1966)
 De capa caída (2000)
 Igor Stravinsky (1882–1971)
 Rite of Spring (1913). Arr. by Vyacheslav Gryaznov
 Valse des fleurs (1914)
 Concerto for Two Pianos (1935)
 Tango (1940). Arr. by Victor Babin
 Sonata for Two Pianos (1943)
 Attila Szervác (1973-)
vostanco – a Libre art canon for 2 pianos (1992)
 Pyotr Ilyich Tchaikovsky (1840-1893)
 Waltz from the opera Eugene Onegin (1878). Arr. by Victor Babin
Joan Trimble (1915–2000)
The Humours of Carrick (1938)
The Bard of Lisgoole (1938)
Buttermilk Point (1938)
Sonatina (1940)
The Green Bough (1941)
Pastorale (Hommage à F. Poulenc) (1943)
The Gartan Mother's Lullaby (1949)
The Heather Glen (1949)
Puck Fair (1951)
 Davide Verotta (1958-)
 Crisp, for two Pianos (2020) Link to YouTube Video Link to IMSLP Score
 Massimiliano Viel (1964-)
 Corale (1997)
Jacob Weinberg (1879-1956)
Sonata for Two Pianos in E-flat major (1908); unpublished
 Charles Wuorinen (born 1938)
 The Mission of Virgil (1993)
 Fifty Fifty (2002) in honor of Oliver Knussen's 50th birthday
 Ivan Wyschnegradsky (1893–1979)
 The following works are all for 2 pianos tuned a quarter-tone apart:
 Quatre fragments, Op. 5 (1918)
 Dithyrambe, Op. 12 (1923–24)
 Prélude et danse, Op. 16 (1926)
 2 Études de concert, Op. 19 (1931)
 Étude en forme de scherzo, Op. 20 (1931)
 Prélude et fugue, Op. 21 (1932)
 24 Préludes dans tous les tons de l'échelle chromatique diatonisée à 13 sons, Op. 22 (1934, 1960)
 2 Fugues, Op. 32 (1951)
 Études sur les densités et les volumes, Op. 39b (1956)
 Dialogue à deux, Op. 41 (1958–1973)
 Composition II, Op. 46b (1960)
 Intégrations, Op. 49 (1962)
 Tomislav Zografski (1934–2000)
 Sonatina for Two Pianos Op. 142 (1969)
 Sonata for Two Pianos Op. 122 (1990)

References

External links 
 Works for two pianists or more
 Repertoire list for two pianists or more
 Repertoire list (including works for four pianos)
 Repertoire list for works for piano duet and two pianos
 Repertoire list for two pianos and for piano duet

Piano duo